Kalkberg also known as "Collar Back" is a ridge in Greene County, New York, United States. It is located in the Catskill Mountains southeast of Catskill. Kykuit is located east-northeast and Quarry Hill is located north of Kalkberg.

References

Mountains of Greene County, New York
Mountains of New York (state)